Silverwood School (formerly Rowdeford School and briefly North Wiltshire School) is a special needs community school, near Rowde, Wiltshire, England, for young people with complex needs and autistic spectrum disorders (ASD) aged between 11 and 16. The school caters for 130 pupils. In 2008 the school was awarded specialist status in communication and interaction.

The school is run by Wiltshire Council with additional support from Rowdeford Charity Trust, an independent charity that is focused on the advancement of education for young people with disabilities and special needs. The school is built around Rowdeford House, a two-storey country house built in 1812 for Wadham Locke, later MP for Devizes.

Weekday boarding places were provided for 23 children but this was reduced to 16 places in September 2016 and Wiltshire Council withdrew funding for these in March 2018 causing the boarding to be shut down in July 2018.

In 2020 Rowdeford School formally merged with Larkrise School in Trowbridge and St Nicholas School in Chippenham to form North Wiltshire School. The school currently operates over the three former school sites with a unified management structure. The former Rowdeford site acts as the headquarters of the school. In 2021 the school was renamed Silverwood School. The former Rowdeford site is in the process of being completely rebuilt and will (when completed) be the only site for the whole school.

References

External links
 Silverwood School official website
 Rowdeford Charity Trust

Special schools in Wiltshire
Community schools in Wiltshire
Special secondary schools in England